HC Dalen, also known as Dalen Hockey, is a Swedish ice hockey club located in Jönköping, founded on 3 September 1966 out of the previous ice hockey sections of Norrahammars IK and Tabergs SK. The club will play the 2014–15 season in group South of Hockeyettan, the third tier of Swedish ice hockey. The club plays its home games in SkandiaMäklarna Center Norrahammar, which has a capacity of 1900 spectators.

The club played in the Swedish second division in the seasons of 1974-1975 and 1986-1987

References

External links
Official website
Club profile on Eliteprospects.com

Ice hockey teams in Jönköping County
Ice hockey teams in Sweden
1966 establishments in Sweden
Ice hockey clubs established in 1966